David Lindsay, 1st Lord Lindsay of Balcarres (baptised 17 March 1587 – died March 1642) was a Scottish nobleman. He was born in Edinburgh, the son of John Lindsay of Balcarres, Lord Menmuir and Marion Guthrie.

He married Lady Sophia Seton, daughter of Alexander Seton, 1st Earl of Dunfermline and Lilias Drummond, on 16 February 1612, in Dunfermline, Fife. He was invested as a knight in 1612, and created Lord Lindsay of Balcarres on 27 June 1633. He was a staunch royalist. He was buried in the Chapel at Balcarres, Fife. He had one son, Alexander, later the first Earl of Balcarres, and a daughter Sophia, who died in childbirth following her marriage to Robert Moray.

References

1587 births
1642 deaths
Nobility from Edinburgh
Lords of Parliament (pre-1707)
David
Peers of Scotland created by Charles I
Members of the Parliament of Scotland 1639–1641